Ellen Ash Peters (born March 21, 1930 in Berlin) is an American lawyer and judge.  She was appointed to the Connecticut Supreme Court in 1978. She was the first woman appointed to that court.

Early life and education
Ellen Ash was born in Berlin on March 21, 1930; her father was Jewish and a lawyer, and her grandfather was also a lawyer.

Her family fled the Nazis in 1938 and briefly lived in the Netherlands before immigrating to the New York City in 1939. Peters attended Hunter College High School in New York, Swarthmore College, and Yale Law School, receiving her LL.B. cum laude in 1954.

Career
Peters clerked for Chief Judge Charles Edward Clark of the U.S. Court of Appeals for the Second Circuit for one year, and was a research associate at the University of California at Berkeley Law School (Boalt Hall) for another year.

Peters became assistant professor at Yale Law School in 1956 and full professor in 1964 before being named Southmayd Professor of Law, a post she held from 1975 to 1978, when Governor Ella Tambussi Grasso appointed Peters to the Connecticut Supreme Court. Peters was the first woman to gain tenure at Yale Law School. Peters was the first female state supreme court justice appointed by a female governor.

After Peters was appointed to the bench, she remained an adjunct professor until being appointed chief justice in 1984 by Governor William A. O'Neill. Peters remained chief justice until 1996, when she took senior status, leaving the court in 2000 when she reached mandatory retirement age.

After stepping down from the Supreme Court of Connecticut, Peters remained active on the bench, sitting from 2000 to 2014 as a judge trial referee on the Connecticut Appellate Court in Hartford.

Peters is currently a visiting professor of law at the University of Connecticut Law School.

Notable decisions
Sheff v. O'Neill refers to a 1989 lawsuit and the subsequent 1996 Connecticut Supreme Court case (Sheff v. O'Neill, 238 Conn. 1, 678 A.2d 1267) that resulted in a landmark decision regarding civil rights and the right to education. In 1996 the Connecticut Supreme Court ruled that the state had an affirmative obligation to provide Connecticut's school children with a substantially equal educational opportunity and that this constitutionally guaranteed right encompasses the access to a public education which is not substantially and materially impaired by racial and ethnic isolation. The Court further concluded that school districting based upon town and city boundary lines are unconstitutional, and cited a statute that bounds school districts by town lines as a key factor in the high concentrations of racial and ethnic minorities in Hartford. This was a split 4-3 decision, which was authored by Chief Justice Peters.  She was joined in the majority opinion by Justices Robert Berdon, Flemming L. Norcott, Jr., and Joette Katz. Justice David Borden authored the dissent, with Justices Robert Callahan and Richard Palmer concurring with the dissent.

Memberships, awards and honors
Peters is an alumni fellow of the Yale Corporation and a former member of the board of managers of Swarthmore College. She is a member of the Council of the American Law Institute, the American Philosophical Society, and the American Academy of Arts and Sciences.

Peters was the first recipient of the Ella T. Grasso Distinguished Service Medal, and has received a number of other awards, including the Connecticut Trial Lawyers' Association Judiciary Award, the Yale Law School Distinguished Service Medal, the Hartford College for Women's Pioneer Woman Award, and the National Center for State Courts' Warren E. Burger Award (2002). She received an honorary Doctor of Laws from the University of Connecticut in 1992.

March 21, 2015, was declared "Ellen Ash Peters Day" in Connecticut by Governor Dannel P. Malloy of Connecticut.

Personal life
Peters's first marriage was to Robert Peters, a psychiatrist. They had three children and subsequently divorced.

Peters then married Phillip I. Blumberg, the former dean of the University of Connecticut Law School. The couple lives in West Hartford.

Sources 
 Remarks by Justice Peters upon her retirement
 Peters receives award from National Center for State Courts

See also 
 List of female state supreme court justices

References 

1930 births
American women lawyers
American women judges
Chief Justices of the Connecticut Supreme Court
Justices of the Connecticut Supreme Court
Jewish emigrants from Nazi Germany to the United States
Hunter College High School alumni
Swarthmore College alumni
Living people
People from Berlin
Women chief justices of state supreme courts in the United States
Women in Connecticut politics
Yale Law School alumni
Yale Law School faculty
American women legal scholars
American legal scholars
American women academics
20th-century American women
21st-century American women
20th-century American women judges
20th-century American judges
Members of the American Philosophical Society